Par 27 is a Canadian sports television series which aired on CBC Television from 1978 to 1980.

Premise
Each episode featured a contest between two golfers who each played nine balls towards a hole.  Each shot was rated at par 3, thus the total of "Par 27" per player. Of the nine shots per player, three were from the tee, three were situated 50 yards from the green and the remaining three from a bunker. Al Balding and Bob Panasik provided commentary with host Ernie Afaganis.

Scheduling
This half-hour series was broadcast on Saturday afternoons as follows:

See also
 Golf With Stan Leonard
 Tee to Green

References

External links
 

CBC Television original programming
1978 Canadian television series debuts
1980 Canadian television series endings
1970s Canadian sports television series
1980s Canadian sports television series